New Yorkers For Children (NYFC) was founded in 1996 by Nicholas Scoppetta in Manhattan, New York as a not for profit organization helping people who have aged out of the foster care system. The organization focuses on the academic success of foster children. NYFC's goal is to help all youth in the foster care system succeed academically and with equal opportunity in the workforce. With their partner Administration for Children's Services (ACS), NYFC is able to provide school supplies, access to academic counselling, job opportunities, access to schools, as well as financial support to keep them in school.

Since its founding New Yorkers For Children has raised and donated over $55 million to its programs, scholarships, and its partnership with ACS.

Background 
Nicholas Scoppetta founded NYFC after he was recruited by New York mayor Rudolph W. Giuliani to run the newly formed children service agency. Scopetta was credited for facilitating the re-formulation of the system which resulted in improved training, management, pay, and accountability. He was also successful in getting more children adopted out of the system, reducing case loads, as well as hiring more employees. With these achievements Scoppetta formed NYFC and was the President of Board of Directors until his retirement in 2013 where he was replaced by Eric Brettschneider. Brettschneider started working in the child welfare and social services in 1967 and has worked in various specializations of that sector ever since. With his experience he has pledged to  "continue the tradition Nick (Scoppetta) established - empowering the child welfare community".

Projects
 Back to School Package Program
The program aims at supplying people from the foster system with supplies necessary for their successful completion of a bachelor's degree. The package, valued at $1000, comes with a metro pass, laptop, and Amazon gift card intended to help the student purchase more supplies and eliminate some of their disadvantages. NYFC has provided 8,000 packages to 2,500 students in foster care.

 Nicholas Scopetta Scholarship Program
This program provides financial, emotional, and academic support to students to ensure their successful completion of an academic career. Working together with the "private sector, foster care agencies, CUNY (City University of New York, the system of universities in New York) and Private Colleges in New York City" the NYFC has been able to provide a support system for the students in or leaving foster care.

 The Charles Evans Emergency Educational Fund
This Emergency Fund goes to people leaving the foster care system and financially supports them to be able to complete their educations without having to worry about their financial situations too much. Since these students leave the care of the foster system without the traditional support from families they often live pay cheque to pay cheque. Once a financial emergency hits, the students are forced to decide between their education and finding a job to raise funds for their basic needs. The Charles Evans Emergency Educational Fund provides students with financial support to ensure they continue their education.
 The Spirit Award
The Spirit Award is given to a student from the foster care system that is succeeding in college as well as demonstrating leadership, commitment to the community, determination, and has shown the ability to overcome barriers. In 2016 the award was given to two students in full ($10,000) and second place prizes were awarded to two students of the value of $2,500.
 Wrap to Rap

The Wrap to Rap is a holiday event where board members, friends of the NYFC, and teens of the community join together to wrap Christmas presents. The gifts go to children in foster care. The event serves as a community event to support the organizations efforts while allowing teens the opportunity to learn of the struggles of others and simultaneously getting them involved in volunteering for the community.
 The Youth Advisory Board (YAB)
The Youth Advisory Board is in charge of promoting social change in regards to changing how the social system supports foster children once they are too old for foster care. Their social policy efforts fight mainly for affordable housing, post secondary opportunities, and funding for college.

Funding 
New Yorkers For Children makes most of its revenues from foundation and business organizations contributions. In 2016 alone the organization made $3.2 million in foundation and business organizations contributions. NYFC's special events bring in the second largest amount of revenue. From 2012 to 2016 NYFC's events brought in on average $2.1 million. Each event honours a few of the children receiving aid from the foundation and supplies them with proper clothing attire for the night. The events are also each sponsored by a big brand or corporation, for example Chloé and by Circa in 2010. In 2015 the Spring Dinner Dance was presented by Saks Fifth Avenue, the Fool's Fete of 2012 was sponsored by CD Greene. Each of these big named sponsors bring in different crowds of people to the events and increases and diversifies the organizations base of donors.
 The New Yorkers For Children Annual Fall Gala
Held every year in the fall, NYFC's New Yorker For Children Annual Fall Gala at Cipriani 42nd Street consistently raises over $1.2 million. With tickets starting at $1,200 and tables being sold for up to $50,000, the evening is always a success for the organization. The event is attended by actors, designers, athletes, journalists, artists, wealthy business entrepreneurs, and singers all willing to spend big money for charity. The Gala is meant to raise money as well as acknowledge people for their own charitable efforts. It also receives media coverage from well known news outlets like Vogue, InStyle, and New Getty.
 New Yorkers For Children Spring Dinner Dance
In 2015 the event held at the Mandarin Oriental raised $750,000 with tickets selling out before they are made open to the public. In 2015 the event was publicized not only for its philanthropic work but also because it honoured the fashion legend Oscar de la Renta giving the event an edge in the media. More attention is brought to the event due to the attendance of well known people like actress Emma Roberts as well as royalty of a Saudi Prince in 2013. Although the event does not raise as much money as the Annual Fall Gala, the publicity that the organization gets largely affects its donations.

Public Support 
New Yorkers For Children receives a lot of supports from public figures, actors, artists, singers, athletes, etc. In 2009 Anderson Cooper, anchor for CNN, hosted the annual fall gala. This night included awarding Mary J. Blige the Nicholas Scoppetta Child Welfare Award for her own organization FFAWN which empowers and supports women to go to college.

Past honourees include Secretary of State Hillary Rodham Clinton, Geoffrey Canada, Russell Simmons, and All-Pro Linebacker for the New York Giants, Keith Bulluck. This list of honourees shows the diverse background of people that participate in charitable functions.

Furthermore, the annual fall gala also included Ne-Yo performing his hit songs and Oscar-nominated director Tony Gilroy premiered his short film about eight youth in foster care. 19 youth who receive aid from NYFC were guests of honour. Macy's provided them with clothing while MAC Cosmetics and French hairstylist Frederic Fekkai provided hair and makeup.

In 2013 Hugh Jackman co-chaired the event with his wife Deborra-Lee Furness. Jackman expressed his appreciation and support for New Yorkers For Children: "I love what New Yorkers for Children does. It's at a grass-roots level, it doesn't throw money here and there, it really looks after kids with what they need emotionally as well as financially."

Work With Administration for Children Services 
New Yorkers For Children is partnered with the government organization Administration for Children Services (ACS). NYFC supports the organization's projects financially. In 2016 the NYFC donated $100,000 in grants to fund the Community Connections Project, The Door Project, and ACS Special Programs and Events. The Community Connections Project is a detention release initiative that works to support low risk individuals that are being removed from detention and rehabilitated in their homes with their families. The Door project works to offer homeless people and "system-involved" young people better access to post-secondary opportunities. This initiative is community based and supported by education services, and external partnerships. ACS Special Programs and Events promotes child wellbeing projects specifically Safe Sleep Symposium and Child Abuse Awareness month.

References

Charities based in New York City
Non-profit organizations based in New York City
Children's charities based in the United States